Sestre may refer to:

 Sestre (drag act), a Slovenian drag act
 The Sisters (2011 film), or Sestre, a film about human trafficking